The 1950 Pacific Tigers football team represented the College of the Pacific as an independent during the 1950 college football season. In their fourth season under head coach Larry Siemering, the Tigers compiled a record of 7–3–1 and outscored their opponents 348–131. Debuting this season was the new Pacific Memorial Stadium, in Stockton, California, which was the Tigers' home until the football program was discontinued after the 1995 season.

Schedule

Friday night games: September 22, October 6, November 24

Team players in the NFL
One College of the Pacific player was selected in the 1951 NFL Draft.

Notes

References

Pacific
Pacific Tigers football seasons
Pacific Tigers football